Championship League was a PDC darts tournament that used a league and legs format similar to the Premier League but offered the top players outside the top 8 in the PDC Order of Merit a chance to compete for the championship. It was the first ever darts tournament to be solely broadcast on and funded by Internet distribution.

The tournament was first announced on the official PDC website in mid-April under the name 'Championship of Darts'. It took place throughout September and October and featured a field of 29 players. The inaugural championship – the 2008 Championship League Darts – was held at the Crondon Park Golf Club in Essex and featured a prize fund of £189,000 and a place in the Grand Slam of Darts for the winner. Phil Taylor won the inaugural championship.

The final tournament was held in 2013.

Internet coverage
As there were no spectators in the playing room, coverage was exclusive to the Internet. The choice to broadcast the tournament over the Internet had been partly inspired by the Championship League snooker event and was also a successor to the live streaming of certain matches from the Blue Square UK Open regional finals from the PDC Pro Tour. The streaming was aided by the company Perform, a digital sports agency. Live streaming of every game was available on several sports betting websites, and was available internationally except in the United States of America where, for legal reasons, the Championship could not be shown.

Final results

Finalists

References

External links
 Championship League Darts page on the PDC website

 
Sports leagues established in 2008
Sports leagues disestablished in 2013
2008 establishments in England
2013 disestablishments in England
Professional Darts Corporation tournaments